The androgen receptor (AR), also known as NR3C4 (nuclear receptor subfamily 3, group C, member 4), is a type of nuclear receptor that is activated by binding any of the androgenic hormones, including testosterone and dihydrotestosterone, in the cytoplasm and then translocating into the nucleus. The androgen receptor is most closely related to the progesterone receptor, and progestins in higher dosages can block the androgen receptor.

The main function of the androgen receptor is as a DNA-binding transcription factor that regulates gene expression; however, the androgen receptor has other functions as well. Androgen-regulated genes are critical for the development and maintenance of the male sexual phenotype.

Function

Effect on development 
In some cell types, testosterone interacts directly with androgen receptors, whereas, in others, testosterone is converted by 5-alpha-reductase to dihydrotestosterone, an even more potent agonist for androgen receptor activation. Testosterone appears to be the primary androgen receptor-activating hormone in the Wolffian duct, whereas dihydrotestosterone is the main androgenic hormone in the urogenital sinus, urogenital tubercle, and hair follicles. Testosterone is therefore responsible primarily for the development of male primary sexual characteristics, whilst dihydrotestosterone is responsible for secondary male characteristics.

Androgens cause slow maturation of the bones, but more of the potent maturation effect comes from the estrogen produced by aromatization of androgens. Steroid users of teen age may find that their growth had been stunted by androgen and/or estrogen excess. People with too little sex hormones can be short during puberty but end up taller as adults as in androgen insensitivity syndrome or estrogen insensitivity syndrome.

Knockout-mice studies have shown that the androgen receptor is essential for normal female fertility, being required for development and full functionality of the ovarian follicles and ovulation, working through both intra-ovarian and neuroendocrine mechanisms.

Maintenance of male skeletal integrity 
Via the androgen receptor, androgens play a key role in the maintenance of male skeletal integrity. The regulation of this integrity by androgen receptor (AR) signaling can be attributed to both osteoblasts and osteocytes.

Role in females 

The AR plays a role in regulating female sexual, somatic, and behavioral functions. Experimental data using AR knockout female mice, provides evidence that the promotion of cardiac growth, kidney hypertrophy, cortical bone growth and regulation of trabecular bone structure is a result of DNA-binding-dependent actions of the AR in females.

Moreover, the importance of understanding female androgen receptors lies in their role in several genetic disorders including androgen insensitivity syndrome (AIS). Complete (CAIS) and partial (PAIS) which are a result of mutations in the genes that code for AR. These mutations cause the inactivation of AR due to mutations conferring resistance to circulating testosterone, with more than 400 different AR mutations reported.

Mechanism of action

Genomic 
The primary mechanism of action for androgen receptors is direct regulation of gene transcription. The binding of an androgen to the androgen receptor results in a conformational change in the receptor that, in turn, causes dissociation of heat shock proteins, transport from the cytosol into the cell nucleus, and dimerization. The androgen receptor dimer binds to a specific sequence of DNA known as a hormone response element. Androgen receptors interact with other proteins in the nucleus, resulting in up- or down-regulation of specific gene transcription. Up-regulation or activation of transcription results in increased synthesis of messenger RNA, which, in turn, is translated by ribosomes to produce specific proteins. One of the known target genes of androgen receptor activation is the insulin-like growth factor 1 receptor (IGF-1R). Thus, changes in levels of specific proteins in cells is one way that androgen receptors control cell behavior.

One function of androgen receptor that is independent of direct binding to its target DNA sequence is facilitated by recruitment via other DNA-binding proteins. One example is serum response factor, a protein that activates several genes that cause muscle growth.

Androgen receptor is modified by post-translational modification through acetylation, which directly promotes AR-mediated transactivation, apoptosis and contact-independent growth of prostate cancer cells. AR acetylation is induced by androgens and determines recruitment into chromatin. The AR acetylation site is a key target of NAD-dependent and TSA-dependent histone deacetylases and long non-coding RNA.

Non-genomic 
More recently, androgen receptors have been shown to have a second mode of action. As has been also found for other steroid hormone receptors such as estrogen receptors, androgen receptors can have actions that are independent of their interactions with DNA. Androgen receptors interact with certain signal transduction proteins in the cytoplasm. Androgen binding to cytoplasmic androgen receptors can cause rapid changes in cell function independent of changes in gene transcription, such as changes in ion transport. Regulation of signal transduction pathways by cytoplasmic androgen receptors can indirectly lead to changes in gene transcription, for example, by leading to phosphorylation of other transcription factors.

Genetics

Gene 
In humans, the androgen receptor is encoded by the AR gene located on the X chromosome at Xq11–12.

Deficiencies 
At least 165 disease-causing mutations in this gene have been discovered.  The androgen insensitivity syndrome, formerly known as testicular feminization, is caused by a mutation in the androgen receptor gene on the X chromosome (locus: Xq11–Xq12). The androgen receptor seems to affect neuron physiology and is defective in Kennedy's disease. In addition, point mutations and trinucleotide repeat polymorphisms have been linked to a number of additional disorders.

CAG repeats 
The AR gene contains CAG repeats that affect receptor function, where fewer repeats leads to increased receptor sensitivity to circulating androgens and more repeats leads to decreased receptor sensitivity. Studies have shown that racial variation in CAG repeats exists, with African-Americans having fewer repeats than non-Hispanic white Americans. The racial trends in CAG repeats parallels the incidence and mortality of prostate cancer in these groups.

Mutations 
The enhancer and the gene encoding for these receptors contain recurrent mutations, such as structural rearrangements and copy number changes, acquired in the progression of metastatic castration-resistant prostate cancer (mCRPC) treatment with therapy targeting these receptors (abiraterone, enzalutamide), make the disease progression determined by the androgen receptor genotype.

Structure

Isoforms 
Two isoforms of the androgen receptor (A and B) have been identified:
 AR-A – 87 kDa; N-terminus truncated (lacks the first 187 amino acids), which results from in vitro proteolysis.
 AR-B – 110 kDa; full length

Domains 
Like other nuclear receptors, the androgen receptor is modular in structure and is composed of the following functional domains labeled A through F:
 A/B) – N-terminal regulatory domain contains:
 activation function 1 (AF-1) between residues 101 and 370 required for full ligand-activated transcriptional activity
 activation function 5 (AF-5) between residues 360–485 is responsible for the constitutive activity (activity without bound ligand)
 dimerization surface involving residues 1–36 (containing the FXXLF motif; where F = phenylalanine, L = leucine, and X = any amino acid residue) and 370–494, both of which interact with the ligand binding domain (LBD) in an intramolecular head-to-tail interaction
 C) – DNA binding domain (DBD)
 D) – Hinge region; flexible region that connects the DBD with the LBD; along with the DBD, contains a ligand dependent nuclear localization signal
 E) – Ligand binding domain (LBD) containing
 activation function 2 (AF-2), responsible for agonist induced activity (activity in the presence of bound agonist)
 AF-2 binds either the N-terminal FXXFL motif intramolecularly or coactivator proteins (containing the LXXLL or preferably FXXFL motifs)
 A ligand dependent nuclear export signal
 F) – C-terminal domain

Splice variants 
AR-V7 is an androgen receptor splice variant that can be detected in circulating tumor cells of metastatic prostate cancer patients and is predictive of resistance to some drugs.

Clinical significance 

High expression in androgen receptor has been linked to aggression and sex drive by affecting the HPA and HPG axis

Aberrant androgen receptor coregulator activity may contribute to the progression of prostate cancer.

Ligands

Agonists 
 Endogenous androgens (e.g., testosterone, dihydrotestosterone, androstenedione, androstenediol, dehydroepiandrosterone)
 Synthetic androgens (e.g., methyltestosterone, metandienone, nandrolone, trenbolone, oxandrolone, stanozolol)

Mixed 
 Selective androgen receptor modulators (e.g., andarine, enobosarm)

Antagonists 
 Steroidal antiandrogens (e.g., cyproterone acetate, chlormadinone acetate, spironolactone, oxendolone)
 Nonsteroidal antiandrogens (e.g., flutamide, nilutamide, bicalutamide, enzalutamide, apalutamide, RU-58841)
 N-Terminal domain antiandrogens (e.g., bisphenol A, EPI-001, ralaniten, JN compounds)

As a drug target 
The AR is an important therapeutic target in prostate cancer. Thus many different antiandrogens have been developed, primarily targeting the ligand-binding domain of the protein. AR ligands can either be classified based on their structure (steroidal or nonsteroidal) or based on their ability to activate or inhibit transcription (agonists or antagonists). Inhibitors that target alternative functional domains (N-terminal domain, DNA-binding domain) of the protein are still under development.

Drug resistance
Alteration of ARs may lead to treatment resistance (castration resistance) in prostate cancer as there may be missense mutations of the ligand binding domain, amplifications of the gene coding for this receptor or in its enhancer, mostly, suggesting the presence of different subclones with different genotypes of these receptors.

Interactions
Androgen receptor has been shown to interact with:

 AKT1,
 BAG1,
 Beta-catenin,
 BRCA1,
 C-jun,
 Calmodulin 1,
 Caveolin 1,
 CDK9,
 COX5B,
 CREB-binding protein,
 Cyclin D1,
 Cyclin-dependent kinase 7,
 DACH1,
 Death associated protein 6,
 L-DOPA,
 EFCAB6,
 Epidermal growth factor receptor,
 FOXO1,
 GAPDH,
 Gelsolin,
 GNB2L1,
 GSK3B,
 HDAC1,
 HSP90AA1,
 HTATIP,
 MAGEA11,
 MED1,
 MYST2,
 NCOA1,
 NCOA2,
 NCOA3,
 NCOA4,
 NCOA6,
 NCOR2,
 NONO,
 p300,
 PA2G4,
 PAK6,
 PATZ1,
 PIAS2,
 PRPF6,
 PTEN,
 RAD9A,
 RANBP9,
 RCHY1,
 Retinoblastoma protein,
 RNF14,
 RNF4,
 SART3,
 SIRT1,
 SMAD3,
 Small heterodimer partner,
 Src,
 SRY,
 STAT3,
 SVIL,
 Testicular receptor 2,
 Testicular receptor 4,
 TGFB1I1,
 TMF1,
 TRIM68,
 UBE2I,
 UXT, and
 ZMIZ1.

See also
 Membrane androgen receptor
 Discovery and development of antiandrogens

References

External links

  GeneReviews/NCBI/NIH/UW entry on Androgen Insensitivity Syndrome
  OMIM entries on Androgen Insensitivity Syndrome
  GeneReviews/NIH/NCBI/UW entry on Spinal and Bulbar Muscular Atrophy, Kennedy's Disease, SBMA, X-Linked Spinal and Bulbar Muscular Atrophy
 OMIM entries on Spinal and Bulbar Muscular Atrophy, Kennedy's Disease, SBMA, X-Linked Spinal and Bulbar Muscular Atrophy
 
 
 
 
 
 
 

Genes on human chromosome X
3